The British Academy Television Award for Virgin TV's Must-See Moment is awarded annually as part of the British Academy Television Awards. The category was created in 2017 and the winner is usually voted by the public.

Winners and nominees

2010s

2020s

Shows with multiple wins and nominations

Multiple wins
No show has managed to win multiple times.

Multiple nominations

3 nominations
Game of Thrones
Line of Duty

2 nominations
Coronation Street
Doctor Who
Love Island
Strictly Come Dancing

References

Must-See Moment